ParaFlyer may refer to:
Phoenix Industries B1Z ParaFlyer, an American paramotor design
Phoenix Industries CV1 ParaFlyer, an American powered paraglider design
Phoenix Industries TZ-1 ParaFlyer, an American powered paraglider design